Allan James Acosta (August 10, 1924 – May 18, 2020) was an American engineer, and a Richard L. and Dorothy M. Hayman Professor of Mechanical Engineering, Emeritus at California Institute of Technology. He was elected to the American Association for the Advancement of Science and National Academy of Engineering.

References

1924 births
2020 deaths
California Institute of Technology faculty
American mechanical engineers